"Desperado" is a power ballad by the American rock band the Eagles. The track was written by Glenn Frey and Don Henley and appeared on the 1973 album Desperado as well as numerous compilation albums. Although it was never released as a single, it became one of Eagles' best-known songs. It ranked No. 494 on Rolling Stones 2004 list of "The 500 Greatest Songs of All Time".

Composition
According to Henley, "Desperado" was based on a song he started in 1968, written in the style of old songs by Stephen Foster. The song was originally about a friend named Leo and with the opening line "Leo, my God, why don't you come to your senses..."  In 1972, after they had recorded their first album, Eagles, in London, Glenn Frey and Henley decided that they should write songs together, and within a day or two after returning from London they wrote "Desperado". They also wrote "Tequila Sunrise" in the first week of their collaboration. 

In their first songwriting session at Henley's home in Laurel Canyon, Los Angeles, Henley played Frey the unfinished version of the song, and said: "When I play it and sing it, I think of Ray Charles and Stephen Foster. It's really a Southern Gothic thing, but we can easily make it more Western." According to Henley, Frey "leapt right on it – filled in the blanks and brought structure", and the song became "Desperado". Henley added: "And that was the beginning of our songwriting partnership ... that's when we became a team."

Recording
The song was recorded at Island Studios in London, with musicians from the London Philharmonic Orchestra.  The orchestra was conducted by Jim Ed Norman, Henley's friend from his former band Shiloh, who also wrote and arranged the strings for the song.  According to Henley, he was given only four or five takes to record the song by the producer Glyn Johns who wanted to record the album quickly and economically. Henley felt intimidated by the large orchestra, and would later express regret that he did not sing as well as he could. He said: "I didn't sing my best ... I wish I could have done that song again."

Reception
"Desperado" is one of Eagles' most famous songs, and it was ranked No. 494 on the Rolling Stones list of "The 500 Greatest Songs of All Time" in 2004.  It was voted the second-most-favorite Eagles song in a poll of Rolling Stone readers. In 2000, the song was included in MOJO magazine's list of greatest songs, nominated by songwriters such as Paul McCartney, Hal David, and Brian Wilson. Members of the Western Writers of America included it in their list of the Top 100 Western songs of all time. In 2017, Billboard ranked the song number two on their list of the 15 greatest Eagles songs, and in 2019, Rolling Stone ranked the song number three on their list of the 40 greatest Eagles songs.

According to an interview with Don Henley, "Desperado" was not a hit for the Eagles until Linda Ronstadt recorded it.

William Ruhlmann of AllMusic considered it one of Eagles' major compositions.  Paul Gambaccini of Rolling Stone felt it was Henley's rough voice that made the song memorable. The Eagles' recording never charted on Billboard until the death of Glenn Frey, when it reached No. 20 on the Rock Digital Songs chart. After the antagonist of the film Guardians of the Galaxy Vol. 2 claimed that "Brandy" by Looking Glass was "Earth's finest composition", that band's lead guitarist and songwriter Elliot Lurie countered that "Desperado" should have that title.

Personnel
 Don Henley – lead vocals, drums
 Glenn Frey – piano, backing vocals
 Bernie Leadon – electric guitar, backing vocals
 Randy Meisner – bass, backing vocals
 Jim Ed Norman – string arrangement

Certifications and sales

Cover versions

Charted versions

Johnny Rodriguez's version on his 1976 album Reflecting was released as a single, and reached No. 5 on both the Country Singles charts of Billboard in the United States and RPM in Canada.
Clint Black on Eagles' tribute album Common Thread: The Songs of the Eagles. His rendition peaked at No. 54 on Hot Country Songs in 1993 in the US, and No. 52 on the Country chart in Canada.
Diana Krall covered the song on her 2015 album Wallflower and released as a single in September 2014. The song debuted on Billboards Jazz Digital Songs chart at No. 3.
 Alisan Porter performed the song as a competitor in the tenth season of The Voice TV series. Her version charted at No. 24 on Digital Songs.

Other versions

Linda Ronstadt on her 1973 album Don't Cry Now. Henley credited Ronstadt for popularizing the song with this early cover of the song, and described her version as "poignant, and beautiful".
Carpenters on their 1975 album Horizon.
Kenny Rogers on his 1977 album Daytime Friends.
Judy Collins on her 1979 album Hard Times for Lovers
Chris LeDoux on his 1982 album Used to Want to Be a Cowboy.
Emi Fujita of Vamp on Camomile (2001).
Johnny Cash on his 2002 album American IV: The Man Comes Around. Henley sings backup on the track.
Superfly on their 2010 album Wildflower and Cover Songs: Complete Best.
Miranda Lambert performed the song at the 2015 Kennedy Center Honors as a tribute to Eagles.
Kristin Chenoweth covered the song on her 2019 album For The Girls.
The Langley Schools Music Project on the 1977 album.

In popular culture
The original song, along with "Witchy Woman", were both featured in the Seinfeld episode "The Checks". In the episode, the song's impact is poked fun at, as various characters have to pause whatever they are doing and listen to the song, often becoming somber and withdrawn when they do so.

The song inspired the title of the 1987 Western TV movie, Desperado,  written by Elmore Leonard.

References 

1973 songs
1970s ballads
Andy Williams songs
Clint Black songs
Country ballads
Eagles (band) songs
Johnny Rodriguez songs
Kenny Rogers songs
Linda Ronstadt songs
Johnny Cash songs
Kokia (singer) songs
The Carpenters songs
Rock ballads
Song recordings produced by Glyn Johns
Songs written by Don Henley
Songs written by Glenn Frey